Yangmiao is a town in Changfeng County, Anhui, China. , it administers the following five residential communities and twelve villages:
Miaobei Community
Miaonan Community
Sishu Community
Maying Community
Shijing Community
Konggang Village
Dacheng Village
Shuangtang Village
Yangang Village
Dalu Village
Dayuan Village
Zaolinpu Village
Taodian Village
Zhipu Village
Yunfeng Village
Songlou Village
Gudaying Village

References

Township-level divisions of Anhui
Changfeng County